Franklin Otto Weddig (November 1, 1944 – October 26, 2012) was an American politician from Aurora, Colorado. He was a Colorado State Senator from 1994 to 2000 and a State Representative from 2000 to 2004. He served as an Arapahoe County commissioner from 2004 to 2012. He was a member of the Democratic Party.

Frank Weddig was born in West Bend, Wisconsin and was an electrician by trade. He was married to Patrica, and had three daughters.

References

External links
Commissioner Frank Weddig Arapahoe County website

1944 births
2012 deaths
American electricians
Democratic Party Colorado state senators
County commissioners in Colorado
Democratic Party members of the Colorado House of Representatives
People from West Bend, Wisconsin
People from Aurora, Colorado